David González López (born 21 February 1996 in Fontiveros) is a Spanish cyclist, who currently rides for UCI ProTeam .

Major results
2021
 5th Clàssica Comunitat Valenciana 1969
2022
 1st  Mountains classification, Vuelta a Castilla y León

References

External links

1996 births
Living people
Spanish male cyclists
Sportspeople from the Province of Ávila
Cyclists from Castile and León